Gungnae (Korean) or Guonei (Mandarin) City was the capital of the ancient Korean kingdom of Goguryeo, which was located in Manchuria and the Korean Peninsula. The perimeter of its outer fortress measures 2,686m.
It is located in present day Ji'an city, Jilin province, northeast China. Because of its historical importance and exceptional architecture, Gungnae was designated as a UNESCO World Heritage Site in 2004. It is part of the Capital Cities and Tombs of the Ancient Koguryo Kingdom World Heritage Site, together with nearby Hwando Mountain City and the Onyeosan City, in modern northeast China.

History
Gungnae was chosen to become the capital city by the ruler,  Yuri during the 10th month of the year 3 AD. The city was sacked several times until the rise of the 19th ruler, Gwanggaeto the Great, who greatly expanded Goguryeo's territory and made it a formidable power in northeast Asia. When King Gwanggaeto died in 413, his son, Jangsu of Goguryeo, inherited the throne and moved the capital down to Pyongyang in 427. The city played a central role of the kingdom after the power transfer.

Just before the fall of Goguryeo, Gungnae City fell to the Silla-Tang Chinese alliance when General Yeon Namsaeng, son of Yeon Gaesomun, surrendered the city in 666.  Goguryeo fell in 668 when the Tang army captured Pyongyang and took King Bojang and Yeon Namgeon into custody.

Gallery

References

Capitals of former nations
Archaeological sites in China
Major National Historical and Cultural Sites in Jilin
Ancient Korean cities
Former capitals of Korea
World Heritage Sites in China
Goguryeo fortresses